Rajendra Singh Rana  (1 July 1961 – 27 October 2015) was an Indian politician and a member of the 16th Legislative Assembly of Uttar Pradesh of India. He represented the Deoband constituency of Uttar Pradesh and was a member of the Samajwadi political party.

Personal life and education
Rajendra Singh Rana was born in the district of Saharanpur, Uttar Pradesh. Rana held Bachelor of Laws degrees and a postgraduate diploma (in journalism). Before being elected as MLA, he used to work as an advocate and a journalist. Rana was suffering from cancer and died on 27 October 2015 due to the illness.

Political career
Rajendra Singh Rana had been a MLA for two terms. During both his terms, he represented the Deoband constituency. Rana was also a State Minister in Mulayam Singh Yadav's government.

Posts Held

See also
Deoband
Government of India
Politics of India
Samajwadi Party
Uttar Pradesh Legislative Assembly

References 

Uttar Pradesh politicians
Samajwadi Party politicians
People from Deoband
1961 births
2015 deaths
Bahujan Samaj Party politicians